Georgepur is a village in Sultanpur Lodhi tehsil in Kapurthala district of Punjab, India. The village is administrated by a Sarpanch who is an elected representative of village as per the constitution of India and Panchayati raj (India).
 It is located in the middle of Marrypur & Jainpur.

List of cities near the village
Bhulath
Kapurthala 
Phagwara 
Sultanpur Lodhi
Marrypur
Jainpur
Dudwindi
Kalru
Jangla
Boolpur
Maseetan

Air travel connectivity
The closest International airport to the village is Sri Guru Ram Dass Jee International Airport.

References

External links
 Villages in Kapurthala
 List of Villages in Kapurthala Tehsil

Villages in Kapurthala district